Marcelo Mourão Gomes (born September 26, 1979)<ref>U.S. Public Records Index Vol 2 (Provo, UT: Ancestry.com Operations, Inc.), 2010.</ref> is a Brazilian ballet dancer who performed for two decades with the American Ballet Theatre.

 Biography 

Born in Manaus and raised in Rio de Janeiro, Gomes began his dance studies at the Helena Lobato and Dalal Achcar Ballet Schools. At the age of 13 he left Brazil to attend the Harid Conservatory in Boca Raton, Florida, and at 16 he studied for one year at the Paris Opera Ballet school. He also studied at the schools of the Houston Ballet, Boston Ballet, and Cuballet. Gomes was a Prix de Lausanne winner in 1996.

Gomes first joined the American Ballet Theatre in 1997 as a member of the corps de ballet. He was promoted to soloist in 2000 and to principal dancer in 2002. He was named one of "25 to Watch" in 2001 by Dance Magazine. In 2008 was a winner of one of the most prestigious awards in ballet, the Prix Benois de la Danse in Moscow for his role as Othello in Lar Lubovitch's ballet Othello.

Gomes' performances have been seen throughout the world. In addition to his touring with ABT, he has appeared at many international dance festivals, including the World Ballet Festival in Japan. He has been a guest artist with the Mariinsky Ballet, the Bolshoi Ballet, the Dutch National Ballet, the National Ballet of Canada, the Houston Ballet, the Teatro Colón in Buenos Aires, the Teatro Municipal do Rio de Janeiro, and the New York City Ballet. In the summer of 2008, he accompanied Alessandra Ferri on her farewell tour in Japan and Italy.

Gomes resigned from the ABT on December 21, 2017, after the company began investigating a report of sexual misconduct levied against him.

On 15 September 2018, Gomes married his boyfriend Nicholas Palmquist.

Roles
Prince Siegfried and Von Rothbart in Swan LakeDes Grieux  and Lescaut in ManonArmand in La Dame aux CaméliasRomeo in Romeo and JulietAlbrecht in GisellePeasant Pas de deux from GiselleConrad, Ali the Slave, and Lankendem in Le CorsaireThe Prince in CinderellaSolor in La BayadèreThe Bronze Idol in La BayadereBasilio and Espada in Don QuixoteJames in La SylphideFranz in CoppéliaOthello in OthelloPrince Désiré in The Sleeping Beauty
Carabosse in The Sleeping BeautyHenry VIII in VIIIThe Moor in PetrouchkaThe Third Sailor in Fancy FreeThe Man from the House Opposite in Pillar of FireOberon and Lysander in The DreamThe Man (Heaven) and Fortune in HereAfterDanilo and Camille in The Merry WidowHis Imperial Excellency in Offenbach in the UnderworldOnegin and Prince Gremin in OneginJeanne de Brienne and Abderakman in RaymondaRogue in Rabbit and RogueThe Swan in Matthew Bourne's Swan Lake

He created Aktaion in Artemis, the Portrait in Dorian, Death in HereAfter, Sergei in On the Dnieper and leading roles in Black Tuesday, C. to C. (Close to Chuck), Clear, Concerto No. 1 for Piano and Orchestra, From Here On Out, and Glow - Stop''.

References

External links
 Encyclopedia.com entry
 Bio as Guest Performer with Mariinsky
 Article
 Interview
 YouTube of Performance with Alessandra Ferri in "Othello"

Reviews
 NY Times review of Giselle (June 10, 2009)
 NY Times review of Swan Jake (June 24, 2009)
 NY Times review of Romeo and Juliet (July 8, 2009)

1979 births
Living people
People from Manaus
American Ballet Theatre principal dancers
Bessie Award winners
Brazilian male ballet dancers
Prix de Lausanne winners
People from Rio de Janeiro (city)
Prix Benois de la Danse winners
Brazilian emigrants to the United States
LGBT dancers
Brazilian LGBT entertainers